The Padajon Surigao is a Surigao del Norte regional political party in the Philippines, closely affiliated with the Kabalikat ng Malayang Pilipino and later, Lakas–CMD.

There are no results available of the last elections for the House of Representatives, but according to the website of the House, the party holds 2 out of 235 seats (state of the parties, June 2007).

Local political parties in the Philippines
Politics of Surigao del Norte
Regionalist parties
Regionalist parties in the Philippines